Phyllis Schneider is a developmental psycholinguist in the University of Alberta Department of Communication Sciences and Disorders at the University of Alberta Faculty of Rehabilitation Medicine.

Background 
Phyllis Schneider is a developmental psycholinguist in the University of Alberta Department of Communication Sciences and Disorders in the Faculty of Rehabilitation Medicine. Schneider received her PhD from Northwestern University in 1984. Schneider has published in the Journal of Linguistic Anthropology, Child Language Teaching and Therapy, and First Language.

Bibliography 
Per OCLC WorldCat.
 Text Production in Adolescence Formal Operations Skill vs. Explanation (1982)
 Children's ability to restore the referential cohesion of stories (1993)
 Interaction between Children with Developmental Delays and their Mothers during a Book‐sharing Activity (1995)
 Effectiveness of teaching story grammar knowledge to pre-school children with language impairment. An exploratory study (2000)
 Storytelling from pictures using the Edmonton Narrative Norms Instrument (2006)
 Who does what to whom: Introduction of referents in children's storytelling from pictures (2010)

References

External links 

 University of Alberta webpage

Communication scholars
Speech perception researchers
Speech processing researchers
Speech production researchers
Speech and language pathologists
Academic staff of the University of Alberta
Academics in Alberta
Canadian women academics
Linguists from Canada
Women linguists
1952 births
Living people